The dorsal nerve cord is a unique feature to chordates, and it is mainly found in the Vertebrata chordate subphylum. The dorsal nerve cord is only one embryonic feature unique to all chordates, among the other four chordate features-- a notochord, a post-anal tail, an endostyle, and pharyngeal slits. The dorsal hollow nerve cord is a hollow cord dorsal to the notochord. It is formed from a part of the ectoderm that rolls, forming the hollow tube. This is important, as it distinguishes chordates from other animal phyla, such as Annelids and Arthropods, which have solid, ventral tubes. The process by which this is performed is called invagination. The cells essentially convolute into the body cavity, arranging themselves on the dorsal plane above the notochord, as mentioned above. The evolutionary explanation to this adaptation from a solid cord to hollow tube is unknown. In vertebrates, the dorsal nerve cord is modified into the central nervous system, which comprises the brain and spinal cord. The 'hollow' nature of Central Nervous System can be verified by the presence of Ventricles in Brain and Central canal in Spinal cord. 

Dorsal means the "back" side, as opposed to ventral which is the  "belly" side of an organism.

•In bipedal organisms dorsal is the back and ventral is the front. Here the term 'Anterior' is synonymous with ventral & 'Posterior' is synonymous with dorsal.

•In quadrupedal (organisms which walk on four limbs) the dorsal surface is the top (back) and the ventral surface is the bottom (belly). The terms 'Anterior' and 'Posterior' are not synonymous. Anterior refers to the cranial part (towards the head) while Posterior refers to caudal part.

See also
Ventral nerve cord in some invertebrates
Nerve net in cnidaria and echinodermata phyla
Hemichordates, who have both dorsal and ventral cords
Anatomical terms of location

References 

Embryology of nervous system
Chordate anatomy
Animal nervous system